The Wildcard Tour was the tenth concert tour by American country music artist Miranda Lambert, in support of her seventh studio album Wildcard (2019). It began on January 16, 2020, in Tupelo, Mississippi at the BancorpSouth Arena and was scheduled to conclude on October 23, 2020, in Ottawa at the Canadian Tire Centre.

Opening acts
American Texas country singer Cody Johnson and American country band LANCO will serve as supporting acts for most of the duration of the tour. Other supporting acts include Texan group Randy Rogers Band and American singer-songwriter Parker McCollum from February 6 to 8, 2020 in Kansas City, Tulsa and Dallas.

Set list 
The following set list is obtained from the January 16, 2020 show in Tupelo, Mississippi. It is not intended to represent all dates throughout the tour.

"White Trash"
"Kerosene"
"Mess With My Head"
"Famous in a Small Town"
"It All Comes Out in the Wash"
"Vice"
"Bluebird"
"Heart Like Mine"
"Over You"
"Airstream Song"
"Track Record"
"That's the Way That the World Goes' Round" (John Prine cover)
"Say You Love Me" (Fleetwood Mac cover)
"Feelin' Alright" 
"Baggage Claim"
"Locomotive"
"Gunpowder & Lead"
"Mama's Broken Heart"
"All Kinds of Kinds"
"The House That Built Me"
"Misery and Gin" (Merle Haggard cover)
"Tequila Does"
"Automatic"
"White Liar"
"Little Red Wagon"
Encore
"Pretty Bitchin'"

Tour dates

Cancelled Dates

Notes

References

2020 concert tours
Miranda Lambert concert tours